Aa weddelliana is a species of orchid in the genus Aa.

It is native to Peru, Bolivia and Northwest Argentina at altitudes of 2700 to 3800 meters. It blooms in the summer.

References

weddelliana
Plants described in 1912